Stanford Jolley, Jr. (May 17, 1926 – June 4, 2012),  known as Stan Jolley, was an American art director and production designer, originally employed by Walt Disney Studios before he struck out on his own. 

In an unusual reprise of a crew role, Jolley was the production designer for the Quinn Martin TV series The FBI, and then over a decade later for the updated series Today's FBI, produced by Martin's longtime competitor David Gerber.

He was nominated for an Academy Award in the category Best Art Direction for the 1985 film Witness.

In 1958, his father, I. Stanford Jolley, appeared on ABC's Walt Disney Presents in the role of Sheriff Adams in the episode "Law and Order, Incorporated", with Robert Loggia as Elfego Baca. Stan, then 32 years old, was the art director of the segment.

Stan Jolley died of gastric cancer in 2012, aged 86.

References

External links

1926 births
2012 deaths
American art directors
American production designers
Artists from New York City
Disney people
Deaths from stomach cancer
Deaths from cancer in California